Haliplus furcatus is a species of water beetle from Haliplidae , family that can be found in Central Europe (except Switzerland) and Northwestern Europe (except for Faroe Islands, Iceland, and Ireland).

References 

Beetles described in 1887
Beetles of Europe
Haliplidae